The Sea of Cronus was also referred as the Gulf of Rhea and was what today is called the Adriatic Sea. By the Latinized name 'Cronium Mare' it appeared on many 17th century maps.

Apollonius Rhodius
The gulf mentioned by the Sea of Cronus was one of the seas traversed by the Argonauts in Apollonius Rhodius' Argonautica.

Ovid
In Ovid's Fasti the author mentions the ancient idea that Saturn (identified with Cronus), after Jupiter (identified with Zeus) had dethroned him from the celestial realms in Olympus, had wandered through the seas on a ship until he came to the Tuscan river. Hence the peopled were called Saturnian and the land Latium (from latente).
From this it may be that the gulf became known as the Sea of Cronus.

Recent authors
In Ignatius Donnelly's Atlantis: The Antediluvian World (1882) the author mentions that the Romans referred to the Atlantic as the 'Cronian Sea'.

Notes

References
Aeschylus. Prometheus Bound. Loeb Classical Library.
Apollonius Rhodius. Argonautica. Loeb Classical Library.
Ovid. Fasti. Loeb Classical Library.
Donnelly, Ignatius. Atlantis: the Antediluvian World. (1882)

External links
 http://www.theoi.com/Text/AeschylusPrometheus.html
 http://www.theoi.com/Text/ApolloniusRhodius4.html
 http://www.theoi.com/Text/OvidFasti1.html
 http://www.sacred-texts.com/atl/ataw/ataw402.htm

Adriatic Sea